András Sánta (born 1 June 1985, in Braşov) is a Romanian football player of Hungarian ethnicity who currently plays for Soproni VSE.

References 
Player profile at HLSZ 

1985 births
Living people
Sportspeople from Brașov
Romanian sportspeople of Hungarian descent
Romanian footballers
Association football goalkeepers
Hévíz FC footballers
Gyirmót FC Győr players
BFC Siófok players
Ceglédi VSE footballers
Győri ETO FC players
Budapest Honvéd FC players
Budapest Honvéd FC II players
Pécsi MFC players
Szigetszentmiklósi TK footballers
Nemzeti Bajnokság I players
Romanian expatriate footballers
Expatriate footballers in Hungary
Romanian expatriate sportspeople in Hungary